Churches Together in Britain and Ireland (CTBI) is an ecumenical organisation. The members include most of the major churches in England, Scotland, Wales and Ireland. CTBI is registered at Companies House with number 05661787. Its office is in Central London.  the General Secretary is Nicola Brady, who succeeded Bob Fyffe.

Its stated aims are to "serve the churches of the four nations on their shared journey towards full visible unity in Christ" and works in areas of Faith and Order, Mission, Inter Faith, Church and Society, Racial Justice, International Affairs and International Students. It also produces material for the "Week of Prayer for Christian Unity" and "Racial Justice Sunday".

CTBI works closely with Action of Churches Together in Scotland, Churches Together in England, Cytûn (Churches Together in Wales), and the Irish Council of Churches. CTBI, unlike its predecessor the British Council of Churches, includes the Catholic Bishops' Conferences of England and Wales and of Scotland as full members, and the Catholic Bishops' Conference of Ireland as an Associate Member.

The members of CTBI

See also
Conference of European Churches
World Council of Churches
Christian Aid
The Council of Christians and Jews (CCJ)
Churches' Mutual Credit Union
Jennifer Marianne Hart

References

External links

Christianity in Ireland
Christian organisations based in the United Kingdom
Organisations based in the City of Westminster
Regional councils of churches
1990 establishments in the United Kingdom
1990 establishments in Ireland
Religion in the City of Westminster
Christian organizations established in 1990
Church of Scotland